Alexander Andreevich Dulov (May 15, 1931, Moscow — November 15, 2007) was a Soviet and Russian poet, songwriter, bard, and chemist.

Biography 
Alexander Dulov graduated from Moscow State University with a specialization in Chemistry and worked at the Russian Academy of Science Institute of Organic Chemistry. Dulov started to write songs in the early 1950s. He has written more than 200 songs over his career. A few of his songs were written based on his own poetry, but the majority used the poetry of other authors such as Sasha Cherny, Vladislav Khodasevich, Konstantin Bal'mont, Vasily Kurochkin, Nikolay Gumilev, Nikolay Rubtsov, Anna Kipner, Varlam Shalamov, Daniil Andreev, Yevgeny Yevtushenko, Igor Irtenyev, Alexander Kushner, and others. Alexander Dulov died on November 15, 2007.

Publications 
 Александр Дулов. А музыке нас птицы научили. М., Вагант, 2001.

Discography 
 Ариозо неглупца (2000)
 Дорога в дождь (1999)
 Три сосны (2000)
 Наш разговор

1931 births
2007 deaths
Moscow State University alumni
Russian chemists
Soviet chemists
20th-century chemists
Russian bards
Russian male poets
Soviet male singer-songwriters
20th-century Russian singers
20th-century Russian male singers